Federal Route 88, or Jalan MACRES, is a main federal road in Pahang, Malaysia. The road connects Mentakab to Mentakab-Temerloh Bypass (Federal Route 2).

Route background
The Kilometre Zero of the Federal Route 88 starts at Mentakab.

Features
At most sections, the Federal Route 88 was built under the JKR R5 road standard, allowing maximum speed limit of up to 90 km/h.

List of junctions and towns

References

Malaysian Federal Roads